Fitness Tour is a Hong Kong comedy-drama produced in 1992. It is directed by Liu Guoquan, and Lydia Shum, Hou Yiaohua, Gong Hanlin, Jiang Qingging, and Dong Liifan are its main actors.

Plot
Manager Hou is very wealthy, and he comes up with another idea to make money. He organized a weight loss tour which lets the fat man go to the tourist side of the Three Gorges River. There they can both go sightseeing and lose weight. He asks a beautiful girl, Jingjing, to be the leader, which attracts a lot of fat people. The guide QinQin gradually gets to know Hou's hypocrisy and cheating behavior, and stands up to protect the interests of customers. Hou finally admits his mistakes, and gets everyone's understanding. Finally, all members in the tour more or less lose weight, except Lydia from Hong Kong, who is still very fat and always keeps eating.

See also
Weight loss
Who's That Girl World Tour

References

1992 films
1992 comedy-drama films
Hong Kong comedy-drama films
1990s Hong Kong films